Palaquium crassifolium is a tree in the family Sapotaceae. The inflorescences bear up to three flowers. The specific epithet crassifolium means "thick leaves".

Distribution and habitat
Palaquium crassifolium is endemic to Borneo, where it is known only from Sarawak. Its habitat is mixed dipterocarp forests.

Conservation
Palaquium crassifolium has been assessed as endangered on the IUCN Red List. The species is considered uncommon and is threatened by logging and land clearance for palm oil plantations.

References

crassifolium
Endemic flora of Borneo
Trees of Borneo
Flora of Sarawak
Plants described in 1909